Raglius is a genus of dirt-colored seed bugs in the family Rhyparochromidae. There are about 11 described species in Raglius.

Species
These 11 species belong to the genus Raglius:
 Raglius alboacuminatus (Goeze, 1778)
 Raglius confusus (Reuter, 1886)
 Raglius pineti (Herrich-Schaeffer, 1835)
 Raglius simplex (Jakovlev, 1883)
 Raglius tisifone
 Raglius tristis (Fieber, 1861)
 Raglius vulgaris (Schilling, 1829) (sometimes considered Rhyparochromus vulgaris)
 Raglius zarudnyi (Jakovlev, 1905)
 † Raglius austerus Statz & Wagner, 1950
 † Raglius decoratus Statz & Wagner, 1950
 † Raglius pulchellus Statz & Wagner, 1950

References

Further reading

External links

 

Lygaeoidea
Pentatomomorpha genera